The Fourth Soviet Antarctic Expedition was an expedition in Antarctica led by Aleksandr Gavrilovich Dralkin.

According to Soviet News:

The expedition ... made a scientific trek from the shores of the Indian Ocean to the Geographical South Pole and back, covering a distance of nearly 2500 miles to the Vostok Station.

See also
 Soviet Antarctic Expedition
 Kharkovchanka

References
  Eds (June 1960) "The Record" in The Geographical Journal. 126(2):248–55

 04
Soviet Antarctic Expedition 04
Soviet Antarctic Expedition 04
Soviet Antarctic Expedition 04
1958 in Antarctica
1959 in Antarctica
1960 in Antarctica